KKSP (93.3 FM) is a commercial radio station broadcasting from Little Rock, Arkansas (licensed to suburban Bryant). KKSP airs a contemporary Christian format branded as "933 FM The Fish".  The station's studios are located in West Little Rock, and the transmitter tower is located on Shinall Mountain, near the Chenal Valley neighborhood of Little Rock.

History
On December 27, 2011, KKSP changed their format from rock to talk, branded as "Fresh Talk 93.3".

On January 10, 2013, KKSP changed their format to sports, branded as "93.3 The Source".  On November 14, 2014, KKSP rebranded as "93.3 The Jock".

On April 2, 2015, upon Salem Communications assuming the commercial operations of 93.3 and KHTE,  KKSP changed their format to contemporary Christian, branded as "93.3 The Fish". On April 3, Capitol City filed an application to sell KKSP to Salem's South Texas Broadcasting, Inc. Salem's purchase of the station closed on October 1, 2015, at a price of $1.5 million.

References

External links

Salem Media Group properties
KSP